"Mind of a Stoner" is a song by American rapper Machine Gun Kelly. It was released on June 23, 2013, for digital download by Bad Boy and Interscope. The song features guest vocals from American rapper Wiz Khalifa.

Background and release 

MGK announced the mixtape on January 28, 2013. On February 18, 2013, Kelly revealed the mixtape's title to be "Black Flag", along with the cover art. Black Flag was released on June 23, 2013, with "Mind of a Stoner" enlisted as the fifth track on the project. The song was officially recognized as the fifth single on February 10, 2014.

Music video 

The music video was released February 11, 2014. It was directed by Charlie Zwick, and features cameos from Kid Ink, and Danielle Fishel, whom he acknowledges as Topanga. The video's concept shows Kelly speaking of his problems and personal troubles, walking up to a bus stop where Khalifa offers Kelly weed, and the rest of the video sees Kelly smoking his problems away. as of 2022 the music video had attained over 170 million views, making it one of Baker's most popular.

Awards

References 

2013 songs
Machine Gun Kelly (musician) songs
Wiz Khalifa songs
Songs written by Wiz Khalifa
Songs written by Machine Gun Kelly (musician)